Maj. Roland Elphinstone Gordon  (22 January 1883 – 30 August 1918) was a Scottish rugby union player and British Army officer who was killed in World War I.

Gordon was the son of civil servant George Dalrymple Gordon and Georgina Meredith Williams Gordon, of "Alwyns," Teignmouth, Devon. He was born in Selangor, Straits Settlements, Malaya, where his father worked in the colonial government's irrigation department.

He was educated at The King's School, Canterbury. In 1911, he entered the Royal Military Academy, Woolwich where he was captain of the rugby XV. In January 1913, he was commissioned as a second lieutenant in the Royal Artillery.

His rugby career was interrupted in 1913, when he was posted to India. After the war began, he was sent to Mesopotamia, where he was seriously wounded. During his recovery at Exeter, he coached the Royal Artillery cadets. He also played for the Cadet XV in 1916–17, playing against the Army Service Corps XV before returning to the front in 1917.

He was wounded again in 1917 and for a third time in May 1918. He was awarded the Military Cross in the 1918 Birthday Honours. He was killed in the Second Battle of the Somme in the final days of the war in 1918. He is buried in the Daours Communal Cemetery Extension in Daours.

References

External links
 "An entire team wiped out by the Great War".  The Scotsman, 6 November 2009

1883 births
1918 deaths
People from Selangor
Scottish rugby union players
Scotland international rugby union players
British military personnel killed in World War I
Royal Field Artillery officers
Recipients of the Military Cross
British Army personnel of World War I